Cray is a supercomputer manufacturer based in Seattle, Washington, US.

Cray may also refer to:

 Crayfish

Places

United Kingdom
 River Cray, London, England
 North Cray, a village on the outskirts of London, England
 Cray, North Yorkshire, a village in England
 Cray, Perth and Kinross, a location in Scotland
 Cray, Powys, a community in Wales
 Cray Reservoir, a reservoir on the Afon Crai in the Brecon Beacons, Wales

Elsewhere
 Cray (crater), on Mars

Fiction
 Cray (Bas-Lag), a fictional race in China Miéville's fiction
 Cray, a character from the Breath of Fire IV role-playing game
 Damian Cray, a character in the Alex Rider series

Other uses
 Cray (surname), a list of people
 Cray Wanderers F.C., a football club based in Bromley, England

See also
 
 Crays Pond
 Kray (disambiguation)